is a passenger railway station located in the city of Imabari, Ehime Prefecture, Japan. It is operated by JR Shikoku and has the station number "Y36".

Lines
Connections with other local or limited express trains are needed to travel further east or west along the line.

In addition, the following JR Shikoku limited express services also serve the station:

Layout
The station consists of an island platform and a side platform serving three elevated tracks. The station building houses a waiting room, shops, a bakery, a JR Midori no Madoguchi staffed ticket office and a JR Travel Centre (Warp Plaza). The platforms are located on the third level. Passengers may cross from the side to the island platform and vice versa through a passage on the second level served by elevators and escalators. Bicycle rental is available at the station. Car parking and car rental is available just outside the station building.

Adjacent stations

History
At that time the station was operated by Japanese Government Railways, later becoming Japanese National Railways (JNR). With the privatization of JNR on 1 April 1987, control of the station passed to JR Shikoku.

Surrounding area
Imabari City Hall
Imabari Meitoku High School
Ehime Prefectural Imabari Kita High School
Ehime Prefectural Imabari Nishi High School

See also
 List of railway stations in Japan

References

External links

Imabari Station (JR Shikoku)

Railway stations in Ehime Prefecture
Railway stations in Japan opened in 1924
Imabari, Ehime